Celeste Liddle (born 1978) is an Indigenous feminist (Arrernte), unionist, and writer who lives in Melbourne, Australia. Having first risen to prominence via her personal blog, Rantings of an Aboriginal Feminist, Liddle has written opinion and commentary for several media publications and anthologies. Liddle hosted the IndigenousX program from 19 June 2015.

Liddle has been a regular columnist for Eureka Street since 2017, having written her first opinion piece for them two years earlier. She has also been a columnist and featured writer for Daily Life, The Saturday Paper, and The Guardian. She's additionally provided commentary for the Australian Broadcasting Corporation (ABC) and Special Broadcasting Service (SBS).

Liddle is an activist and environmentalist who works as the National Aboriginal and Torres Strait Islander Organiser for the National Tertiary Education Union (NTEU). Liddle was instrumental in ensuring that the NTEU vocally supported the campaign to Raise The Age of criminal responsibility in Australia.

In 2020, Liddle undertook a Masters at Monash University and in 2021 was awarded the Academic Medal for Excellence.

In addition to opinion writing, Liddle has been published in a number of anthologies including Black Inc's Growing Up Aboriginal In Australia, Pan McMillan's "Mothers and Others" and Hardie Grant's "Better than Sex". In 2017, she was inducted into the Victorian Honour Roll of Women.

Liddle has been involved in several major literary events including the All About Women Festival, Melbourne Writers' Festival, the Antidote Festival, The Melbourne Anarchist Bookfair and the Bendigo Writers' Festival.

Early life
Liddle was born in Canberra, Australia, and moved to Melbourne with her family when she was 14. Her father is an Arrernte man from Central Australia and her mother is mainly of Irish and English descent whose forebears moved to Melbourne from the 1850s onwards. Through her father, she is related to notable Aboriginal activists Charlie Perkins and Bob Randall. Liddle is also cousin to current SA Liberal Senator Kerrynne Liddle.

Liddle has an honours degree in Arts from La Trobe University, a Graduate Diploma from the University of Melbourne and a Masters in Communications and Media Studies from Monash University.

Politics
On 14 May 2021, Liddle was announced to be preselected by the Victorian Greens for the progressive seat of Cooper in the 2022 federal election. Cooper is the Melbourne electorate where Liddle has lived for over 20 years. Her campaign has set out to include dental into medicare, enhance workers' rights, increase renewable energy in response to the climate emergency, and work towards truth and treaty for First Nations people. Liddle is also a strong advocate for the Greens policy to tax billionaires and for Melbourne's live music and arts scenes.

In the 2022 election, Liddle gained 27.7% of the primary vote, coming second to the incumbent labor trade Unionist Ged Kearney. However she increased the Greens vote by 6.7% while Labor's decreased by -5% on the previous election.

References

External links
 Official Website
 Celeste Liddle on Twitter
 Celeste Liddle on Instagram

Indigenous Australian writers
Living people
Australian feminist writers
Australian socialists
Australian anarchists
Arrernte people
Indigenous Australian feminists
Australian indigenous rights activists
Women human rights activists
University of Melbourne alumni
La Trobe University alumni
Australian trade unionists
1978 births